Maja Tvrdy (born 20 November 1983) is a Slovenian badminton player. She competed for Slovenia at the 2012 Summer Olympics.

Maja Tvrdy is the most successful badminton player of Slovenia, who participated and represented Slovenia at two Olympic Games: 2008 Summer Olympic Games in Beijing, where she achieved 17th place in the individual event and the Summer Olympic Games 2012 in London, where she lost in the qualifying round. She is only the second Slovenian female player to participate at any Olympic Games in this sport (after Maja Pohar – Sydney Olympics in 2000).

She won two bronze medals at Mediterranean Games in Mersin 2013 – 3rd place in the individual event and 3rd place in women's doubles event, partnered by Nika Koncut.

Achievements

Mediterranean Games 
Women's singles

Women's doubles

BWF International Challenge/Series
Women's singles

Women's doubles

 BWF International Challenge tournament
 BWF International Series tournament
 BWF Future Series tournament

Slovenian National Badminton Championships

She is 14-times Slovenian National Badminton Championships winner:
 8-times national champion in the individual event (in the years 2004, 2006, 2007, 2008, 2009, 2011, 2012, 2013). 
 5-times national champion in women's doubles event (in 2002 – partnered by Maja Pohar, 2003 – partnered by Maja Kersnik, 2004 – partnered by Maja Kersnik, 2009 – partnered by Špela Silvester, 2013 – partnered by Živa Repše)
 1-time national champion in mixed doubles (in 2006 – partnered by Luka Petrič)

References

External links
 

1983 births
Living people
Slovenian female badminton players
Olympic badminton players of Slovenia
Badminton players at the 2008 Summer Olympics
Badminton players at the 2012 Summer Olympics
Mediterranean Games bronze medalists for Slovenia
Competitors at the 2013 Mediterranean Games
Mediterranean Games medalists in badminton
21st-century Slovenian women